Nallila is a small village in Kollam district of Kerala, India. This place is known for famous churches like St Mary’s Malankara catholic church,St. Gabriel Orthodox Valiyapally, Bethel Pilgrim Churich, Nallila Valliyapally.

Native plants include natural rubber, banana, jackfruit, black pepper, guava, and Syzygium samarangense, with an abundance of Paddy fields and natural streams.

Key aspects of the local economy are rubber harvesting, banking, and remittances from migrant workers

References

Villages in Kollam district